"Slow Wind" is a 2005 single by R. Kelly from his seventh solo studio album TP.3 Reloaded, which is the second sequel to his iconic album known as 12 Play. The song was entirely written and produced by R. Kelly himself. The song is about three and a half minute long and a music video has been made for the song. "Slow Wind" is the fourth single on the album and went on to become a top 30 hit in Germany and also made it at number 30 in the R&B/Hip Hop charts in the US, The remix made it at number 91 in the same chart and was released on R. Kelly's first remix compilation album the same year, Remix City, Volume 1. The remix featured Sean Paul and the R&B singer Akon on the track. No music video has been made for the remix, the remix is about one minute longer than the original.

Music video
The music video is directed by Little X. and features Kelly with Jamaican females.

Charts

Remix

References

2005 singles
R. Kelly songs
Songs written by R. Kelly
Song recordings produced by R. Kelly
Jive Records singles
Music videos directed by Director X